Sing My Song (season 3) was broadcast on CCTV-3 from January 29, 2016, to April 8, 2016, presented by Yang Fan (杨帆). Yu Quan and Liu Huan both returned as tutors. Tanya Chua and Wakin Chau did not return  this season, allowing new tutors Mavis Fan and David Tao to join the panel. The winner was Mountain People band (山人乐队) of Liu Huan team and Wang Wu (王兀) of David Tao team was the runner-up.

Tutors and Finalists

The blind audition

The blind audition
A special rule was added from season 2, each tutor has 3 chances to press the "straight access" button. If a contestant is chosen by that button of any tutor and they also choose that tutor, they can pass directly the selection round after.

Episode 1 (January 29)
Episode 1 on CCTV's official YouTube channel

Episode 2 (February 5)
Episode 2 on CCTV's official YouTube channel

Episode 3 (February 12)
Episode 3 on CCTV's official YouTube channel

Episode 4 (February 19)
Episode 4 on CCTV's official YouTube channel

Episode 5 (February 26)
Episode 5 on CCTV's official YouTube channel

Episode 6 (March 3)
Episode 6 on CCTV's official YouTube channel

The second time of selection

This part was broadcast at the end of episode 6. Each tutor must choose 6 best performances between their 12 choices after the blind audition (exclude the performances was chosen by "straight access" button). 6 contestant groups, who are chosen by tuteur, advance in the composer round and their music products will be certainly in their tutor album.

The composer and the battle stage

Voted by the team tutor
In each team, six contestants divided into three pairs, each contestant of each pair had to compose a new song following the title of, a Chinese film or Chinese television series, chosen by their tutor, then they performed their new songs on the same stage.

The winner of each pair, selected by their tutor, could be advanced to the next round. The three other tutors could also voted for the song that they liked to listen but it didn't have any influence on the principal team tutor's choice.

Episode 7 (March 11)
Episode 7 on CCTV's official YouTube channel

Liu Huan team - "Happy Commune" (歡樂公社)

Mavis Fan team - "Happy with the Alliance" (開心著聯盟)

Episode 8 (March 18)
Episode 8 on CCTV's official YouTube channel

David Tao team - "No Two Team" (無二戰隊)

Yu Quan team - "Masters Team" (巨匠戰隊)

Voted by 51 media juries
The four tutors have made together a lucky drawing to search the opposite team for their team, so the result was the battle between Liu Huan team and David Tao team, between Mavis Fan team and Yu Quan team.

The contestant in each battle pair was decided by their team tutor; each contestant had to compose another new song to perform and the winner of each pair was the person who won the highest number of 51 media jury votes.

The six final winners of this round represented their teams to perform on the final stage. Because the format of this battle is direct elimination, so impossible to ignore the case that a team would be all eliminated or would be all advanced.

Few Sing My Song's ex-contestants appeared in the media jury panel like Wang Xiaotian (王晓天) (Season 1, Yang Kun team's Top 8), Su Yunying (苏运莹) (Tanya Chua team, Season 2's runner-up), Luo Er (裸儿) (Liu Huan team, Season 2's Top 8).

Episode 9 (March 25) – Mavis Fan team VS Yu Quan team
Episode 9 on CCTV's official YouTube channel

Episode 10 (April 1) – Liu Huan team VS David Tao team
Episode 10 on CCTV's official YouTube channel

Episode 11 (April 8) - Final
Episode 11 on CCTV's official YouTube channel

The six contestants could chosen the best of their songs in the previous rounds to perform one by one, with their tutor or their tutor guest. After the 3rd, 4th, 5th, 6th performance, the audience have voted directly to eliminate a contestant of the triple at this moment.

The two last contestants with their songs was voted publicly by 101 media juries. The song that won the highest vote would take the title "Best Chinese Song of the Year", that contestant would become the winner and would take the final cup of Sing My Song.

Result

Top 10 Songs of Sing My Song (season 3)

Top 10 songs was synthesized on internet by votes of the media and the spectators. Each winner receive a blue trophy symbolized the G-clef in music.

Ratings

Notes

2016 in Chinese music
2016 Chinese television seasons